Higher Ground Productions, also known simply as Higher Ground, is an American production company founded in 2018 by former United States President Barack Obama and former First Lady Michelle Obama.

History
In May 2018, the Obamas launched Higher Ground Productions by signing a multi-year deal with Netflix to produce scripted and unscripted film and television projects, with the goal of the company to lift up diverse voices in the entertainment industry. Michelle Obama stated "I have always believed in the power of storytelling to inspire us, to make us think differently about the world around us, and to help us open our minds and hearts to others." In February 2019, Priya Swaminathan, Tonia Davis, and Qadriyyah “Q” Shamsid-Deen joined the company, with Swaminathan and Davis serving as co-heads, and Shamsid-Deen serving as a creative executive.

On June 6, 2019, Spotify announced a partnership with Higher Ground to produce Spotify-exclusive podcasts. The first podcast under the partnership, The Michelle Obama Podcast, premiered on July 29, 2020.

The company's first film was American Factory, released in 2019. Netflix released Becoming a documentary following Michelle Obama on her book tour promoting her memoir of the same name.

Higher Ground has multiple projects in development, including a feature film adaption of Frederick Douglass's biography, a drama series set in the fashion scene of post-WWII New York City, and a scripted anthology series of the New York Times obituary column highlighting deaths of remarkable people not reported.

In June 2022, it was announced that Higher Ground would be ending its partnership with Spotify, as it signed a multi-year, multi-million-dollar deal with Audible.

Awards
In 2020, the company won an Academy Award for Best Documentary Feature and a Primetime Emmy Award for Outstanding Directing for a Documentary/Nonfiction Program for American Factory.

Productions

Feature films

Documentaries

Television

Podcasts

References

 
Film production companies of the United States
Documentary film production companies
American companies established in 2018
Entertainment companies established in 2018
Barack Obama
Michelle Obama